Lamine Fomba (born 26 January 1998) is a French professional footballer who plays as a midfielder for  club Saint-Étienne. He is a former under-17 international for France.

Club career
Fomba signed his first professional contract for Auxerre on 13 May 2016. Fomba made his professional debut for Auxerre in a 2–0 loss to AC Ajaccio on 20 September 2016 in the Ligue 2.

On 28 January 2023, Fomba signed a contract with Saint-Étienne until June 2025.

International career
Fomba was born in France and is of Malian descent. Fomba represented the France national under-17 football team at the 2015 FIFA U-17 World Cup, making 2 appearances.

References

External links
 
 
 
 

1998 births
People from Rosny-sous-Bois
Footballers from Seine-Saint-Denis
French people of Malian descent
Living people
French footballers
France youth international footballers
Association football midfielders
AJ Auxerre players
Nîmes Olympique players
AS Saint-Étienne players
Ligue 1 players
Ligue 2 players
Championnat National 2 players
Championnat National 3 players